The 2019 SHISEIDO Cup of China was the fourth event of the 2019–20 ISU Grand Prix of Figure Skating, a senior-level international invitational competition series. It was held at Chongqing Huaxi Culture and Sports Center in Chongqing, China from November 8–10. Medals were awarded in the disciplines of men's singles, ladies' singles, pair skating, and ice dance. Skaters earned points toward qualifying for the 2019–20 Grand Prix Final.

Entries
The ISU announced the preliminary assignments on June 20, 2019.

Changes to preliminary assignments

Results

Men

Ladies

Pairs

Ice dance

References

2017
2019 in figure skating
2019 in Chinese sport
November 2019 sports events in China